Jenner & Block is an American law firm with offices in Chicago, London, Los Angeles, New York City, San Francisco, and Washington, D.C. The firm is active in corporate litigation, business transactions, the public sector, and other legal fields. It has litigated several prominent cases before the United States Supreme Court.  As of 2014, it was the 103rd-largest law firm in the US, based on The American Lawyer's annual ranking of firms by headcount.

History
The firm was founded in Chicago in 1914 as Newman, Poppenhusen & Stern. In late 1928, the former chief justice of the Illinois Supreme Court Floyd Thompson joined the firm. Known commonly as "The Judge," Thompson handled several high-profile cases for the firm.

Name partner Albert E. Jenner, Jr., who served as a former assistant counsel to the Warren Commission, established Jenner & Block's longstanding relationship representing General Dynamics in the 1950s. He later was senior minority counsel on the impeachment inquiry staff for the Republicans on the House Judiciary Committee during the impeachment process against Richard Nixon, but was replaced in July 1974 after advocating for the impeachment of Nixon.

Jenner & Block was one of the first national law firms to establish a Washington, D.C., practice specifically focused on appeals before the U.S. Supreme Court. A number of lawyers in the Washington, D.C., office have served as clerks to the US Supreme Court. This office was once headed by Bruce Ennis, Jr., who argued more than a dozen cases before the Supreme Court, including three cases arising under different provisions of the same law, the landmark Telecommunications Act of 1996. The appellate practice is led by Paul M. Smith, a partner with the firm. Donald Verrilli Jr., who succeeded Elena Kagan as U.S. solicitor general during the Obama administration,  is a former member of the practice.

The firm was one of the first large firms in the US to establish a pro bono program.

Since its founding, the firm has had ten names. The name of the firm was changed to Raymond Mayer Jenner & Block in 1964 after Samuel W. Block became a name partner. In 1969, it was shortened to its present form.

Prominent legal work
The firm has a history of litigating and representation in prominent cases, including several argued before the US Supreme Court.  The firm's 1985 antitrust lawsuit of AT&T, on behalf of MCI, sowed the seeds for the eventual break-up of telecommunications monopoly in the 1980s.

The firm's involvement in civil rights cases spans decades.  In the 1960s, the firm represented prominent Chicago cardiologist Jeremiah Stamler when he was subpoenaed to testify before the House Committee on Un-American Activities.  The firm sued the Committee, seeking to have its mandate declared unconstitutional.  After eight and a half years of litigation in the 1960s and 70s, the government agreed to drop its indictment against Dr. Stamler for contempt of Congress, and the doctor agreed to drop his civil suit against the Committee. In 1975, Congress officially abolished HUAC, by that time known as the Internal Security Committee.

In 2009, then firm chairman Anton R. Valukas was appointed as the examiner in the Lehman Brothers bankruptcy, and he hired Jenner & Block to produce the report that captured the findings of a year-long investigation of the bank's finances.  In 2010, the firm oversaw General Motors' $23.1 billion initial public offering of common stock and Series B mandatory convertible junior preferred stock, the largest US IPO ever at the time.

The firm has achieved several victories before the US Supreme Court regarding free speech, gay rights, copyright, civil procedure, political asylum and other matters. The firm's first principal litigator, Edward R. Johnston, earned the firm's first Supreme Court victory, a landmark antitrust case against the US government (Maple Flooring Manufacturers Association v. U.S.) that allowed for trade association members to exchange information.

The firm represented plaintiff Stephen Law in Law v. Siegel in the US Supreme Court in 2014; it had already been representing the plaintiff Law (who had earlier represented himself) in the US Court of Appeals (Ninth Circuit). The Supreme Court overturned a California court's decision to allow Law's home equity to be used as payment for legal fees to a trustee, even though the equity was protected by the state's homestead exemption.

Jenner & Block has continued to represent environmental groups such as the Alliance for the Great Lakes and Natural Resources Defense Council in a Clean Water Act suit against Chicago's Metropolitan Water Reclamation District regarding raw sewage.

Pro bono work

According to annual surveys by The American Lawyer, in 2014 and 2015, Jenner & Block was the leading law firm for per-attorney hours devoted to pro bono work in the US. From 2008 to 2015, it was the leader for five of those seven years.

Recent pro bono victories include the acquittal of Jezon Young and the 2012 acquittal of Calvin Marshall who had been charged with murder.

Notable cases
Maple Flooring Manufacturers' Association v. US:  The firm had an early US Supreme Court victory in an antitrust case that helped establish its appellate credentials.  The firm represented the Maple Flooring Manufacturers Association, a trade association based in Grand Rapids, Michigan.  The US government charged that the group's activities — such as sharing weekly statistics showing charges that had been made for various grades of lumber during the previous week — violated the Sherman Act.  The firm's principal litigator at the time, Edward Johnston, argued that the Association shared permissible economic information.  In June 1925, the Court agreed.
Sam Insull cases:  In the 1930s, former chief justice of the Illinois Supreme Court Floyd Thompson successfully defended Chicago utility czar Samuel Insull in three separate federal and state trials related to the collapse of his empire after the Great Depression.
 Witherspoon v. Illinois:  The firm represented William Witherspoon, who had been sentenced to death for the shooting death of a police officer,  on a pro bono basis.  In 1968, the US Supreme Court ruled that a state statute providing the state unlimited challenge for cause of jurors who might have any objection to the death penalty gave too much bias in favor of the prosecution.  The Court reasoned:  "A jury that must choose between life imprisonment and capital punishment can do little more — and must do nothing less — than express the conscience of the community on the ultimate question of life or death.  Yet, in a nation less than half of whose people believe in the death penalty, a jury composed exclusively of such people cannot speak for the community."  The Court added:  "To execute this death sentence would deprive [Witherspoon] of his life without the due process of the law." As a result of the Witherspoon decision, more than 350 inmates on death row around the nation had their death sentences lifted.
Lawrence v. Texas: A significant case to ensure civil rights for the gay, lesbian and transgender community. In 2003, working with the Lambda Legal Defense Fund, the firm challenged Texas' anti-sodomy statute.  The US Supreme Court struck down the statute, effectively invalidating anti-sodomy laws throughout the nation. Justice Anthony Kennedy wrote that two gay men arrested after police walked in on them having sex "are entitled to respect for their private lives.  The state cannot demean their existence or control their destiny by making their private sexual conduct a crime."
 Lehman Brothers bankruptcy:  After Lehman Brothers filed for bankruptcy in 2008—the largest bankruptcy in US history—the court hired Jenner & Block's Chairman Anton Valukas to examine Lehman's collapse.  Some commentators pointed to the bankruptcy as a factor contributing to the late 2000s global financial crisis. In March 2010, Valukas issued his 2,200-page report on the matter.
 General Motors bankruptcy:  In the late 2000s, General Motors had what The American Lawyer called a "near-death" experience as it filed for bankruptcy.  In 2010, the $23 billion offering by GM set the record as the largest initial public offering (IPO) in history. Jenner & Block represented GM as it went through bankruptcy and the subsequent IPO.
Brown v. Entertainment Merchants Association:  The firm represented the Entertainment Merchants Association in a battle against a California law that restricted the sale or rental of violent video games to minors.  In 2011, the US Supreme Court agreed with the firm's argument that the law violated the First Amendment's protection of freedom of speech and expression.  Justice Antonin Scalia wrote that depictions of violence have never been subject to government regulation.
American Broadcasting Cos. v. Aereo, Inc.: The firm represented a group of broadcasting company clients in a fight against Aereo, Inc., a company that retransmitted copyrighted television programming without broadcaster authorization for a fee. In June 2014, the US Supreme Court agreed with the firm's argument that Aereo violated copyright law.  Aereo filed for Chapter 11 bankruptcy in November 2014.

Recognition
The firm has won many awards for its work. In 2012 and 2013, it was listed as one of the 20 most elite law firms by The American Lawyer, with inclusion on the magazine's A-List for revenue generation, pro-bono commitment, associate satisfaction and diversity representation.  In 2012 and 2014, the firm was awarded the Chambers USA "Award for Excellence" as the top law firm for media and entertainment litigation.

In 2015, The National Law Journal named Jenner & Block to its "Appellate Hot List," a list of 20 national firms "with outstanding achievements before the US Supreme Court, federal circuit courts and state courts of last resort." That marked the seventh consecutive year that the firm was so ranked. The firm was also named to The National Law Journal'''s 2015 "IP Hot List." Also in 2015, Law360 named the firm's Bankruptcy, Workout and Corporate Reorganization Practice a "Bankruptcy Group of the Year."

In 2005, the firm received the National Coalition to Abolish the Death Penalty's "Legal Service Award" for its work with death row inmates. The New York office is a strong contributor to the firm's commitment to pro bono and public service. A team, along with the Veterans Legal Services Clinic at Yale Law School, successfully represented a proposed nationwide class of Vietnam War veterans suffering from post-traumatic stress disorder who challenged their less-than-honorable discharges from the military. In addition to securing discharge upgrades for the named plaintiffs, the representation also prompted the Secretary of Defense to issue new guidance to the administrative boards hearing discharge upgrade requests to consider PTSD diagnoses for veterans, a result that should help thousands of veterans.

In 2015, Jenner & Block was ranked first among all US law firms in the volume of its pro bono work and has ranked first in pro bono work in five of the past seven years, according to The American Lawyer'' annual rankings.

Offices
Jenner & Block is headquartered in downtown Chicago. In 1982, the firm opened an office in Washington, D.C. In 2005, a New York City office was launched followed by the opening of a Los Angeles office in 2009. In April 2015, the firm opened a London office, its first outside of the US.

See also
List of largest United States-based law firms by profits per partner

References

External links

Insolvency and corporate recovery firms
Law firms based in Chicago
Law firms established in 1914
Privately held companies of the United States